W is a British free-to-air television channel owned by BBC Studios. It originally launched on 7 October 2008 as Watch and until 2022 was a pay television channel. On 15 February 2016, the channel was rebranded as W. The channel currently broadcasts crimes, dramas, game shows and documentaries.

History
The channel launched on 7 October 2008 as the new flagship channel for the UKTV network of channels. On Sky, it took over capacity previously used for UKTV Style +2, which had closed on 15 September 2008 in preparation for the launch. The channel would feature general entertainment programmes, primarily from the programme archive of the BBC, who owned a 50% share of the network through the corporation's commercial arm BBC Worldwide. The channel featured flagship programmes from the BBC, such as Torchwood, general entertainment programmes from the corporation and international versions of popular current British programming, such as Dancing with the Stars (the US version of Strictly Come Dancing) and the various American editions of Wipeout, which is titled as Total Wipeout USA to avert confusion with the British programme of the same name. The channel also featured programmes displaced following the repositioning of other UKTV channels, such as the move of all non-crime drama to the channel following Alibi's launch, and programming already shown on other UKTV channels in greater numbers, such as Traffic Cops. The W Channel controller is currently Paul Moreton.

The channel went free on satellite on 21 March 2022, ahead of a full relaunch of W as a free channel on both Freeview and Freesat on a week later on 28 March, with a revised onscreen identity. To make way for the addition of W, Dave ja vu moved to the position previously occupied by Drama +1, which had been added to the Freeview lineup following UKTV's purchase and closure of CCXTV. Drama +1 wasn't replaced on Freeview in the sense of leaving the platform instead it moved to Freeview channel 60 which was previously occupied by ITV4 +1.

Subsidiary channels

W +1
The channel also operates a timeshift service, W +1 (short for the previous name as Watch +1), where the programme schedule is repeated by the channel one hour later. The channel receives no special branding, with the occasional exception of a special Digital on-screen graphic (DOG). It launched the same day as the main Watch channel on 7 October 2008 and was reported by AGB Nielsen Media Research on 2 September 2008.

W HD
On 29 July 2011, UKTV announced that it had secured a deal with Sky to launch three more high-definition channels on their platform. As part of Virgin Media's deal to sell its share of UKTV, all five of UKTV's HD channels would also be added to Virgin's cable television service by 2012. Watch HD launched on 12 October 2011 on Sky and Virgin Media, two days after Dave HD, while Alibi HD launched in July 2012. All three channels are HD simulcasts of the standard-definition channels.
Watch HD became available on BT TV & Plusnet later in the year.

On-air identity

2008–2016
When Watch launched in October 2008, along with G.O.L.D. and Alibi, the original on screen identity featured a large eyeball nicknamed 'Blinky'. The music used in the background of the television advertisements is "You Will Leave a Mark" by Oxford band A Silent Film. The channels original idents featured a liveaction video of the eyeball being pushed around by a large and varied group of people around various settings until the eyeball ends up in the centre of the screen and the Watch name appears at the bottom of the screen. The set of four idents were produced by Red Bee Media for the channel. However, in April 2009, the four existing idents were edited by Aardman Animations to make the inflatable eyeball blink, along with new soundtracks. In addition, four new CGI idents were introduced as well as the edited idents and in May 2010, a new ident for Scream if You Know the Answer!

During May 2010, UKTV were reportedly planning to overhaul the brand identity of Watch, after only eighteen months in operation. The broadcaster held a branding agency pitch and made an appointment within a month, with the review was being handled by creativebrief. The work included the creation of a fresh logo, strap-line and tone of voice for the channel, however, a spokeswoman for UKTV denied suggestions that the broadcaster would change the name of the channel and said that the overhaul was about "tweaking the brand and aligning it better with our overall strategy".

The new Watch logo and channel presentation launched on 23 September 2010, focusing on the idea that "TV is better shared!". The new identity, created by agency Harriman Steel, includes a new strapline, "Watch... together", along with new idents, end frames and a new logo. The idents feature a scene against a black background with various elements of the scene being provided, by people in black outfits. The scenes progress with the appearance of the film being seen in reverse until the ident pans to a screen displaying three phrases related to the scene ending with the word "together." before the Watch logo is placed over the last phrase forming the channel tagline. Other promotional material makes use of the channel tagline or the appearance that the channel promotions are held in place by the black dressed men, as seen by the various covered hands shown at the edge of promotion end boards.

On 23 January 2012, it was announced that Watch would receive a rebrand for a second time, created by DixonBaxi, and was to be launched on 13 February 2012, but only the promos, DOG and ECP changed on that date. But the new idents were made on 9 March 2012.

2016–2022
On 15 January 2016, it was announced that Watch would be renamed to W on 15 February 2016.

In February 2022, Broadcast magazine reported that the channel would become a free-to-air channel in the spring, joining stablemates Dave, Yesterday and Drama as a Freeview service. In March 2022, this was confirmed by UKTV, who rebranded the channel's mantra to "Life Unfiltered" and introduced a new logo which included the letter W in a slanted rectangle. The logo will be mainly seen on air and in corporate branding with an orange background, with channel idents showing a series of relatable human moments behind the logo. This female skewing channel will be still targeted at a 25 to 44 age range and will be on Freeview channel 25 from 28 March 2022. W have a free-to-air launch schedule with programmes such as Inside the Ambulance, Stacey Dooley Sleeps Over, Nurses on the Ward, Emma Willis Delivering Babies, Emma Willis & AJ Odudu Get to Work and Women on the Force, part of the line-up.

2022–present
UKTV confirmed the rumours that the W channel was going to rebrand as a free-to-air channel on 28 March 2022 at 6:00am. To coincide with the move, channel bosses unveiled a new logo and "Life Unfiltered" strapline which they say will help the channel connect with its female skewing 25-44 target audience.

Logo history

Programming

Current on W

999: Rescue Squad
American Housewife
Beverly Hills Pawn
The Bill
Border Patrol
Boston's Finest
Booze Patrol Australia
The Catherine Tate Show
Celebrity Advice Bureau
Celebrity Haunted Mansion 
Celebrity Haunted Mansion: High Spirits 
Celebrity MasterChef
Choccywoccydoodah
Dating with My Mates
David Beckham: Into The Unknown
Derren Brown
DIY SOS
Doctor Who
Emma Willis: Delivering Babies
Emma Willis: Meet the  Babies
Extreme Makeover: Home Edition
Gavin & Stacey
Heston's Fantastical Food
Honey I Bought The House
Humble Pie
In the Club
Inside the Ambulance
I've Got Something To Tell You
John Bishop: In Conversation With... 
Jonathan Creek
Luther
Masterchef Australia
MasterChef Junior USA
MasterChef USA
Million Dollar Intern
The Musketeers
My Dream Home
My Family
Myleene: Miscarriage and Me
Nev's Indian Call Centre
Nick Knowles' Original Features
Nurses on the Ward
Oddities
One Born Every Minute
Outnumbered
Property Brothers
Rochelle Humes: Interior Designer in the Making
Russell Howard's Good News
Sea City
Sherlock
Stacey Dooley Investigates
Stacey Dooley Sleeps Over
The Secrets in My Family 
The Strain
Supernanny  
Tipping Point
Traffic Cops
The Wave
The Wedding Fixer
W1A
Who Do You Think You Are?
Who Do You Think You Are? USA
Women on the Verge

Previous on W

Aaagh! It's the Mr. Hell Show!
Absolutely Fabulous
After You've Gone 
Alcatraz
Atlantis
Bailiffs
Battlechefs
Beauty & the Beast
Being Human
Believe
Ben Earl: Trick Artist
Best In Town
Betty White's Off Their Rockers
Bin There, Dump That
Blues and Twos
The Blue Planet
Border Patrol
Bottom
Cars, Cops And Criminals
Celebrity Haunted Hotel Live 
Celebrity Haunted Hotel: Do Not Disturb
Choccywoccydoodah: Starstruck
Code Black
Criminal Minds: Beyond Borders
Crisis
Coastguard Florida
Confessions from the Underground
Covert Affairs
Dangerman: The Incredible Mr. Goodwin
Daredevil
David Attenborough's Natural Curiosities
Dynamo: Magician Impossible
EastEnders
Emergency Bikers
Escape to the Country
Fake or Fortune?
Flights & Fights - Inside The Low Cost Airlines
Get Me to the Church
Grange Hill
Grimm
The Hairy Bikers' Cookbook
Haunted Collector
Haunted Highway
Helicopter Heroes
Hollywood Treasure
The Honourable Woman
Human Planet
Iceland Foods: Life in the Freezer Cabinet
Jackpots And Jinxes: Lottery Stories
Katherine Mills: Mind Games
Kolkata with Sue Perkins
The Men Who Jump Off Buildings
My Breasts And I
My Flat - Pack Home
My Hero
Nigel Marven's Cruise Ship Adventure
Paranormal Witness
Perception
Planet Dinosaur
Planet Earth
Pointless
Pride and Prejudice
Primeval: New World
Primeval
Quantum Leap
Recruits: Paramedics
Rescue: Code One 
The Restoration Man
Resurrection
Rick Stein's Far Eastern Odyssey 
Road Patrol Australia
The Route Masters: Running London's Roads
The Roux Scholarship 2013
Sara Cox on Friendship
Secrets and Lies
Seven Envelopes
Silk
Singing in the Rainforest
Sky Cops
Sophie on Fame
Stacey Dooley in Australia
Stansted: The Inside Story
Stranded
Supersize My Job
Undercover Boss 
Vets in Practice 
Vets to the Rescue 
World's Most Talented
The World's Strictest Parents

The channel also produced and broadcast the programmes: Baywatch, Richard & Judy's New Position, The Borrowers, Tarrant Lets the Kids Loose, Hart of Dixie, The Weakest Link, Walking with..., Love Soup, Dancing with the Stars, Outtake TV, and Two Pints of Lager and a Packet of Crisps for a time, however, these are no longer broadcast.

Most watched programmes

The following is a list of the 11 most watched shows on W, based on Live +7 data supplied by BARB up to 7 February 2016. The number of viewers does not include repeats or W +1.

See also
 UKTV
 Television in the United Kingdom

References

External links
 at TVA

Television channels and stations established in 2008
UKTV
UKTV channels